Stem or STEM may refer to:

Plant structures 

 Plant stem, a plant's aboveground axis, made of vascular tissue, off which leaves and flowers hang
 Stipe (botany), a stalk to support some other structure
 Stipe (mycology), the stem of a mushroom under the cap
 Stem (vine), part of a grapevine
 Trunk (botany), the woody stem of a tree

Education 
 Science, technology, engineering, and mathematics (STEM), a broad term used in curricula and policy
 STEM.org, an educational publisher and service
 Stem, a multiple choice question lede (excluding the options)

Language and writing 
 Word stem, the part of a word common to all its inflected variants
 Stemming, a process in natural language processing
 Stem (typography), the main vertical stroke of a letter
 Stem (music), a part of a written musical note

Man-made objects 
 Stem (ship), the upright member mounted on the forward end of a vessel's keel, to which the strakes are attached
 Stem (bicycle part), connects the handlebars to the steer tube of a bicycle fork
 Stem (glass), the stem of a drinking glass
 Stem, part of a watch 
 Crack stem, a device for smoking crack cocain

Music and audio 
 Stem (audio), a collection of audio sources mixed together to be dealt with downstream as one unit
 Stem (music), a part of a written musical note
 Stem mixing and mastering, a method of mixing audio material
 The Stems, an Australian garage rock/power pop group from the 1980s

Songs 

 "Stem", a song by Canadian musician Hayden from the 1995 album Everything I Long For
 "Stem" (DJ Shadow song), a song by DJ Shadow from the 1996 album Endtroducing.....
 "Stem", a song by American industrial metal band Static-X from the 1999 album Wisconsin Death Trip
 "Stem" (Ringo Sheena song), a song by Ringo Sheena from the 2003 album Kalk Samen Kuri no Hana
 "Die Stem van Suid-Afrika", a former national anthem of South Africa, used during the apartheid era

Outdoor recreation 
 Stem (skiing), a technique in skiing
 Stem, a term in climbing

Science and technology 

 Stem cell, an undifferentiated biological cell that can differentiate into specialized cells
 Stem group, of a clade (in biological classification), consists of extinct organisms more closely related to the crown group than to any other extant clade
 Science, technology, engineering, and mathematics, a grouping of academic disciplines capitalized as STEM
 Scanning transmission electron microscopy, a type of microscopy
 Spatiotemporal Epidemiological Modeler, software developed by IBM
 Stem, part of a compound variable in the Rexx computer programming language
 Main stem of a river

Other uses
 Stem (film), or Upgrade, 2018 Australian science fiction horror film
 Stem (lesbian), a woman who exhibits some stereotypical butch and lesbian traits
 Stem, North Carolina, a city in Granville County, US

See also
 STEM (disambiguation)
 Stemm (disambiguation)
 STEM Academy (disambiguation)